The Indianapolis Colts are a professional American football team based in Indianapolis, Indiana. They are currently members of the South Division of the American Football Conference (AFC) in the National Football League (NFL).

The club was officially founded in Baltimore, Maryland, in 1953, as the Baltimore Colts, replacing a previous team of that name that folded in 1950. After 31 seasons in Baltimore, Colts owner Robert Irsay moved the team to Indianapolis.

The Colts have had 33 starting quarterbacks (QB) in the history of their franchise. The Colts' past starting quarterbacks include Pro Football Hall of Fame inductee Johnny Unitas, as well as the Associated Press National Football League Most Valuable Player Award (MVP) winners Earl Morrall and Bert Jones. Unitas also won the MVP award three times in his career. The franchise's first starting quarterback was Fred Enke, who started 9 games in total for the Colts. The Colts' starting quarterback from 1998 to 2011 was 5-time MVP Peyton Manning. Manning's tenure was followed by Andrew Luck from 2012 to 2018, until his sudden retirement during the 2019 preseason. Originally meant to serve as a backup, Jacoby Brissett ended up starting 15 games for the Colts in the 2017 season due to Luck being injured, and threw for over 3,000 yards and 13 touchdowns; he returned to his backup role the following year. Following Luck's retirement prior to the 2019 season, Brissett became the Colts full-time starting quarterback. Prior to the 2020 season, the Colts signed free agent Philip Rivers, making Brissett again the backup quarterback. On February 18, 2021, the Colts traded a 2021 third round pick and a 2022 second round conditional pick to the Philadelphia Eagles for quarterback Carson Wentz. Brissett signed as a free agent with the Miami Dolphins, and Wentz became the Colts' starting quarterback. He started all seventeen of the Colts' games in the league's first season in the new format, before being traded to the Washington Commanders. Indianapolis then traded a 3rd-round pick in the 2022 NFL Draft for longtime Atlanta Falcons star Matt Ryan, who started at quarterback in each of the Colts' first seven games to begin the 2022 season.

History

The Colts struggled early on to find consistency and stability at the quarterback position with 5 different quarterbacks starting at least one game in the first two seasons of the franchise. George Shaw became the first Colts quarterback to complete a full season. The following year Shaw broke his leg in the fourth game of the season against the Chicago Bears allowing former Pittsburgh Steeler quarterback Johnny Unitas a chance to start. Over the next 16 seasons Unitas would start 182 games for the Colts. In this time Unitas was named to 10 Pro-Bowls, and won the MVP award 3 times. With Unitas under center the Colts also won 2 NFL Championships and a Super Bowl. In the final game of the 1968 preseason, the muscles in Unitas' arm were torn when he was hit by a member of the Dallas Cowboys defense. The Colts would turn to backup quarterback Earl Morrall to lead the offense. The Colts marched to a league-best 13–1 record and Morrall was named the 1968 MVP. Despite this strong season and the return of Unitas during the game the Colts lost the Super Bowl to the AFL's New York Jets and their quarterback Joe Namath. In 1970 the Colts, with Unitas under center, would return to the Super Bowl in 1970. After Unitas was injured in the second quarter Morrall stepped in and led the Colts from a 7-point deficit at half time to a 3-point victory over the Dallas Cowboys.

Unitas continued as the Colts' legendary QB, but age and injuries began to plague him further and in a hotly debated move, GM Joe Thomas traded him to the San Diego Chargers. The team wasted no time replacing Unitas by drafting Bert Jones in the 1973 NFL Draft. During his eight-year tenure as the Colts' starting quarterback, Jones led the team to three consecutive AFC East division titles and was awarded the 1976 AP MVP award. The Colts regular season success wasn't replicated in the post season, however, with the team losing all three of their playoff games – first the Steelers in 1975 and 1976, then in 1977 a 37–31 loss to the Oakland Raiders, known as the "Ghost to the Post" game and the third longest playoff game ever. It would be the last playoff game ever played by the Baltimore Colts.

Jones began to become injury prone and between that and poor personnel moves, the Colts suffered hard times in the late 1970s/early 1980s. Jones was then traded to the Rams in 1982 and the Colts again began a search for a new starting quarterback. In the interim quarterback Mike Pagel filled in as the starter. In the 1983 NFL Draft the Colts drafted quarterback John Elway, but in another hotly debated and oft-criticized move, Elway declined to play for the team that drafted him, insisting he would play professional baseball instead. The Colts' owner traded him to the Denver Broncos for quarterback Mark Herrmann, rights to offensive lineman Chris Hinton and a first-round pick in the 1984 NFL Draft. Even at the time it was considered a horrible trade for the Colts and a coup for the Broncos. Mike Pagel therefore remained as the starter, though sometimes losing his position to top draft pick Art Schlichter, who was a notorious bust, due largely to a gambling addiction which affected his play and ultimately saw him kicked out of the league.

In the 1986, the Colts selected Jack Trudeau in the 2nd round of the draft. Trudeau would remain the starter for the next few years, though Gary Hogeboom and Chris Chandler were obtained and started at various times. In 1987 Trudeau lead the Colts in their first playoff game since the team moved to Indianapolis. The Colts lost the game against the Cleveland Browns by a score of 38 to 21.

In 1990, the Colts again had the 1st overall and selected quarterback Jeff George, who even then was known as a world-class talent with a questionable attitude. This proved to be accurate, as George's four years in Indianapolis would end with four years of erratic play (behind an admittedly so-so team) with a trade to the Atlanta Falcons.

In 1994 the Colts signed Jim Harbaugh. In 1995, Harbaugh and the Colts surprised everyone by reaching the playoffs. Harbaugh was voted to the Pro Bowl, named Comeback Player of the Year, and was runner-up in the AP NFL MVP voting. The post-season was even more surprising, as Harbaugh led the Colts all the way to the 1995 AFC Championship game, ending a playoff drought of 24 years without a playoff win and narrowly missing a Super Bowl berth on the last play of the game. After a last-place 3–13 record in 1997, Harbaugh was traded to the Baltimore Ravens.

In 1998 the Colts, for the 4th time in 15 years, held the 1st overall pick in the draft and for the 3rd time in 15 years selected a quarterback – this time University of Tennessee's Peyton Manning. Manning started the first game of his rookie season and started every single Colts game since until the start of the 2011 season, when a recurring neck injury sidelined him. Despite a difficult rookie season, where he threw a league high 28 interceptions, Manning and the Colts responded by finishing 13–3 in 1999. The 10 game turnaround from the previous year set an NFL record. Even with this turnaround, the Colts lost in the playoffs. The following years would be marked by a near constant pattern. The Colts and Manning successes in the regular season were matched only by their failures in the post season. Manning was named to the Pro Bowl in 1999, 2000, 2002, 2003 and 2004, as well as winning the NFL MVP award in both 2003 and 2004. In 2004 Manning set a then NFL record when he threw 49 touchdowns in a single season. In spite of this the team failed in the playoffs, including early round exits in 1999, 2000, 2002 and 2005. In both 2003 and 2004 the Colts would lose to eventual Super Bowl winning New England Patriots in the AFC Championship Game and the Divisional Round respectively. In 2006 the Colts and Manning were finally able to beat the Patriots and their quarterback Tom Brady in the AFC Championship Game on their way to a victory in Super Bowl XLI against the Chicago Bears. Manning was named the Super Bowl MVP. The Colts and Manning would continue to have success, with Manning winning two further MVP awards in 2008 and 2009. In 2009 the Colts would return to the Super Bowl where they would lose to the New Orleans Saints.

Starting quarterbacks by season

Regular season

Postseason

Statistics

Peyton Manning holds the record for the most starts as the Colts quarterback, as well as the most wins. Manning has also set franchise records in completions, passing attempts, completion percentage, passing yards, touchdowns and has the highest franchise passer rating while Johnny Unitas holds the record for most interceptions by a Colts quarterback. Manning has taken the most sacks of all the quarterbacks but Bert Jones has lost the most yards while being sacked. Jones also has the record for the longest completed pass by a Colts starting quarterback, with a 90-yard touchdown pass to wide receiver Roger Carr in a home win against the New York Jets in 1975.

Notes
: In each game, a team picks one player to start in the quarterback (QB) position. Players may be substituted during the game, but the term "starting quarterback" refers to the player who started the game in that position.
: All Colts quarterbacks awarded the Associated Press National Football League Most Valuable Player Award (MVP) were also named to the Pro-Bowl in those same seasons.
: When the Colts entered the league in 1953 the Colts played a 12-game schedule. Starting in 1961 the NFL used a 14-game schedule, while since the 1978 NFL season all teams have played 16-game schedules.
: Strikes by the National Football League Players Association in the 1982 and 1987 seasons resulted in shortened seasons (9- and 15-game schedules, respectively).

See also
 Lists of NFL starting quarterbacks

References

External links
 Indianapolis Colts Franchise Encyclopedia

Indianapolis Colts

quarterbacks